Losdorp is a village in the Dutch province of Groningen. It is a part of the municipality of Eemsdelta, and lies about 25 km northeast of Groningen.

History 
The village was first mentioned in 1429 as "toe Lesdorp", and could mean "little village". Losdorp is a terp (artificial living hill) with a radial structure which has been known to exist since 1053. The terp has been partially excavated.

The church probably dates from the 13th century, but has been extensively modified between 1775 and 1776. The tower dated from 1662, but has also been modified in 1775 and received its current spire in 1848.

Losdorp was home to 94 people in 1840. The terp was restored in 2013.

Gallery

References

External links 

Populated places in Groningen (province)
Eemsdelta